General Prince Adekunle was a Nigerian Jùjú musician. He was of Egba origin, from Abeokuta in Ogun State. Prince Adekunle was a major innovator and force in the jùjú music scene, with his distinctive driving Afrobeat style. Famous musicians such as Sir Shina Peters and Segun Adewale started their careers playing with his band, the Western Brothers.
Although he toured in England in the early 1970s, he did not become well known outside Nigeria.

Music
Jùjú music, first developed by Tunde King in the 1930s, formed the basis of Prince Adekunle's music. Highlife musicians like Bobby Benson and Tunde Nightingale introduced jazz concepts and new instruments. Ebenezer Obey and Sunny Adé brought in amplified guitars and synthesizers. All these formed the basis for Adekunle's innovative and forceful new style of juju music.
Afrobeat, pioneered in the late 1960s by Fela Kuti and others, was another major influence on Prince Adekunle and his band the Western State Brothers, later the Supersonic Sounds. 
With a cool but driving, sophisticated style, Prince Adekunle is considered one of the great artistes of Jùjú music.

Influence

Afrobeat also influenced Adekunle's protege Sir Shina Peters who created a unique high-speed "Afro juju" sound.
Sir Shina Peters recalls that when he was young, he was befriended by Prince Adekunle. An agent said he should be called Prince Adekunle's son as a publicity stunt, and that was how he became known as Shina Omo Adekunle. Although the adoption was not real, people accepted it and in a way it became real.
Shina Peters and Segun Adewale, who became two of the biggest stars of the 1980s, both started their careers performing in the mid-1970s with Prince Adekunle.

Jùjú music star and Soko Dance exponent, Dayo Kujore, was another musician who owed much to Prince Adekunle, playing lead guitar on some of his classics such as "Aditu ede" and "Eda n reti eleya".

In May 2004, he was among other musicians who met to discuss ways to reverse the current decline of jùjú music, while opposing the proposal by King Sunny Adé to form a jùjú Musician's Union.

Death
Prince General Adekunle Died on Saturday September 2, 2017.

Discography

A partial list of LPs:

External links

References

Nigerian male musicians
Living people
Yoruba musicians
Musicians from Abeokuta
Yoruba-language singers
20th-century Nigerian musicians
20th-century male musicians
Year of birth missing (living people)